{{Location map
|Somerset
|lat=51.3443
|long=-2.4166
|width=180
|float=right
|caption=Duncorn Hil within Somerset
}}
Duncorn Hill is an English, landmark, rounded hill with a flat top close to the Fosse Way. The hill's name derives from Celtic din for fort and corn'' meaning horn shaped.

Geology

The hill's bedrock is limestone of the Great Oolite Group with deposits of fuller's earth containing fossil shellfish.

History

It has been speculated Duncorn Hill had been the site of a Bronze or Iron Age hill fort. Field investigations were undertaken in 1966, but no evidence of a fort was found. The scarps previously thought to be part of a man-made structure were shown to be natural geological formations. Investigators found no evidence of the cairns described in 18th century descriptions. Nevertheless in 1975, Ralph Whitlock wrote of Iron Age, occupied, hilltop earthworks.

References

Hill forts in Somerset
Iron Age sites in Somerset